Travis Enrique Hernes (born 4 November 2005) is a Norwegian professional footballer who plays as a midfielder for  club Shrewsbury Town.

Career
Hernes made his senior debut for Shrewsbury Town on 30 August 2022, scoring Shrewsbury's consolidation goal in a 2–1 defeat to Wolverhampton Wanderers U21 at the New Meadow.

Career statistics

References
3. https://www.shrewsburytown.com/news/2022/september/travis-hernes-called-up-to-norway-under-18s/

4. https://www.flashscore.co.uk/match/h4W4LQee/#/match-summary/lineups

5.https://www.shrewsburytown.com/news/2022/september/international-round-up-tom-flanagan-and-travis-hernes/

Living people
English footballers
Association football midfielders
Shrewsbury Town F.C. players
2005 births